Uddevalla Municipality is a municipality in Västra Götaland County in western Sweden. Its seat is located in the city of Uddevalla.

The present municipality was created in 1971 when the City of Uddevalla (which had absorbed the rural municipality Bäve in 1945) was amalgamated with the surrounding municipalities Forshälla, Lane-Ryr, Ljungskile, Skredsvik and parts of Skaftö.

Localities
Ammenäs
Fagerhult
Herrestad
Hogstorp
Ljungskile
Sunningen
Uddevalla (seat)

References

External links

Uddevalla Municipality - Official site

Municipalities of Västra Götaland County
Gothenburg and Bohus